Gary Carswell (Gary Lee Stanley Carswell; 29 August 1968 – 11 April 2015) was a Manx solo-motorcycle road racer who worked as a civil engineer.

He was a veteran competitor of the Isle of Man TT with 56 starts, and 12 starts in the Manx Grand Prix (long) road-races held on the 37-mile Snaefell mountain course around the island, also competing in the Southern 100 (short) road-races held on the 4-mile Billown Circuit, near Castletown in the south of the Isle of Man.
 


Racing history
Carswell entered the Manx Grand Prix, a race for amateur competitors, between 1991 and 1997. His best results were a win in the 1997 Senior class and two fifth-place finishes in the 1996 Senior and 1997 Junior classes.

He entered TT races from 1996, with many finishes including a third place in the 2004 Senior TT. In 2007 he raced machines provided by Bolliger Kawasaki, a European World Endurance-racing outfit, gaining a 16th in the Superbike race and 13th in the Senior, in addition to 9th in Superstock and 21st in Supersport classes.

TT race summary

Manx Grand Prix race summary

TT race position details

Personal life
Carswell was a family man who lived in the Ramsey area and worked as an engineer for Manx Utilities, a business providing power, water and gas services within the Isle of Man. He died in Noble's Hospital, Douglas, Isle of Man, on 11 April 2015, after crashing during a practice session at the Jurby Motodrome, Isle of Man, part of a two-day race weekend organised by the Andreas Racing Club.

References

2015 deaths
Manx motorcycle racers
1968 births